Operation Teapot was a series of 14 nuclear test explosions conducted at the Nevada Test Site in the first half of 1955. It was preceded by Operation Castle, and followed by Operation Wigwam. Wigwam was, administratively, a part of Teapot, but it is usually treated as a class of its own. The aims of the operation were to establish military tactics for ground forces on a nuclear battlefield and to improve the nuclear weapons used for strategic delivery.

Teapot series tests

Table notes:

Individual blasts

Wasp

During shot Wasp, ground forces took part in Exercise Desert Rock VI which included an armored task force Razor moving to within  of ground zero, under the still-forming mushroom cloud.

Bee

An augmented test unit from the United States Marine Corps participated in shot Bee during the March 1955 exercises.

MET

The MET was the first bomb core to include uranium-233 (a rarely used fissile isotope that is the product of thorium-232 neutron absorption), along with plutonium; this was based on the plutonium/U-235 pit from the TX-7E, a prototype Mark 7 nuclear bomb design used in the 1951 Operation Buster-Jangle Easy test. It produced a yield of 22kt (comparable to the Fat Man plutonium-only weapon that exploded over Nagasaki), but significantly less than the expected amount. Since it was a military effects test, the DoD specified that the device should have a calibrated yield within 10% of ratings. However, weapon designers at Los Alamos substituted the experimental core without notifying the DoD. The unexpected lower yield, 33% less than the DoD expected, ruined many of the military's tests.

Apple-2

The Civil Defense Apple-2 shot on May 5, 1955 was intended to test various building construction types in a nuclear blast. An assortment of buildings, including residential houses and electrical substations, were constructed at the site nicknamed "Survival Town" by some and "Doom Town" by others. The buildings were populated with mannequins, and stocked with different types of canned and packaged foods. Not all of the buildings were destroyed in the blast, and some of them still stand at Area 1, Nevada Test Site. A short film about the blast, referred to as "Operation Cue", was distributed by the Federal Civil Defense Administration. They are stops on the Nevada National Security Site (NNSS) tour.

From declassified documents dated February to May 1956, the Apple-2 shot, as part of Operation Teapot Project 35.5 "Effects of Nuclear Explosion on Records and Records Storage Equipment" was staged on the Nevada Test Site to determine the effects of nuclear explosions on various types of records and record storage equipment.

See also

 List of United States' nuclear weapons tests

References

 Operation Teapot Project 5.4 Evaluation of fireball lethality using basic missile structures(C)

External links

 
 
 
 
 NPR web page: effect on commercial beverages 
YouTube—Lawrence Livermore National Laboratory (LLNL): "Operation Teapot − Turk 28112" video
YouTube—Lawrence Livermore National Laboratory Channel: LLNL Atmospheric Nuclear Tests website — all uploaded LLNL videos of tests between 1945 and 1962, including 28 of Operation Teapot.

Teapot
1955 in military history
1955 in Nevada
1955 in the environment
1955 disasters in the United States
Explosions in 1955
Articles containing video clips